Dirk de Ridder may refer to:
 Dirk de Ridder (sailor)
 Dirk De Ridder (neurosurgeon)